Mehvish Mushtaq Hakak (Urdu: مہوش مشتاق) (born 1989) is an Application and Software developer, who created a Business Directory App for Kashmir called "Dial Kashmir", in 2013, for the Kashmir valley, which made her the first Kashmiri female to develop an Android app.

Biography 
Born in 1989 in Srinagar, Mehvish Mushtaq is a Kashmiri app developer. At age 23, she developed the 'Dial Kashmir' Android app after completing an Android app design course. Dial Kashmir caters specifically to the Kashmir region. It provides the user with extensive information like addresses, phone numbers and email addresses of various essential and commercial services in various sectors in Kashmir, including hospitals, education, transport, and police. It also includes train, holiday, and prayer schedules, among other features. In 2013, Ahmed Ali Fayaaz of The Hindu described it as a "treasure trove of information on automobile services, hotels, doctors, houseboats, NGOs, real estate, postal codes, and even Waazwaan, Kashmir’s party cuisine, with over a dozen mutton preparations."

, the app had over 50,000 downloads from the Google Play Store and has a rating of 4.3, with over 1,700+ reviews.

Education
Mushtaq attended Presentation Convent Girls School in Srinagar, and completed her secondary education at The Mallinson Girls School. She completed her BE from SSM College of Engineering and Technology.

Awards 
Femina Women's Awards(Online Influencer) — 2014
Space Communications Award — 2014 
ALL Grassroots Women Achievers Award — 2014 
The Sunday Standard Devi Awards Delhi — 2016
 Nari Shakti Puraskar - 2017

References 

Web developers
Web designers
Living people
1989 births
Kashmiri people
Indian computer programmers